Savigny-lès-Beaune (literally Savigny near Beaune) is a commune in the Côte-d'Or department in eastern France.

Geography

Climate
Savigny-lès-Beaune has a oceanic climate (Köppen climate classification Cfb).

Wine

Savigny-lès-Beaune is one of the wine communes of the Côte de Beaune.
The village houses several buildings of architectural interest, including several châteaux, a Romanesque clock tower and a church dedicated to St. Cassien.

Château and museums
The main Château dates from the fourteenth century. It has museums that have little to do with its wine producing activities. The Château has several museum collections: "Musee de la moto" (~250 motorbikes, from 1902-1960); "Musee de la Voiture de Course Abarth" (Abarth racing cars); "Musee de l'Aéronautique" (aviation - around 80 aircraft, mostly warbirds, including many by Dassault and Mikoyan/MiG); "Musee de al Maquettes d'Avion" (around 2,500 1:72 scale model aircraft); "Musee du Tracteur Enjambeur" (tractors) ; "Musee du Matériel Vinaire et Viticole" (viticulture); "Musee des Pompeurs" (fire engines).

See also
 Route des Grands Crus
Communes of the Côte-d'Or department

References

Communes of Côte-d'Or